Percy Amos Mozart Stainer (4 October 1888 – 8 July 1967) was an Australian rules footballer who played with Richmond and St Kilda in the Victorian Football League (VFL).

Notes

External links 

1888 births
1967 deaths
Australian rules footballers from Melbourne
North Melbourne Football Club (VFA) players
Richmond Football Club players
New Norfolk Football Club players
St Kilda Football Club players
People from Carlton, Victoria